Doctors Inlet is an unincorporated community in Clay County, Florida, United States.  It is located near the intersection of County Roads 220 and 224, and is adjacent to the communities of Middleburg, Orange Park, and Lakeside.

References

Unincorporated communities in Clay County, Florida
Unincorporated communities in the Jacksonville metropolitan area
Unincorporated communities in Florida